Peer Mazhar Saeed Shah is a Pakistani politician from Azad Kashmir who is currently serving as a member of the Azad Kashmir Assembly since 2021. Apart from graduating from Jamia Binoria, Karachi, he also holds an MA degree from Karachi University.

Political career
In 2006, Mazhar Saeed Shah participated in the elections from Neelam Valley on the ticket of Muttahida Majlis-e-Amal and got 3500 votes. In 2011, he once again entered electoral politics but withdrew due to his party's alliance with the Muslim Conference. However, after that he withdrew from practical politics at the local level.

In 2022, Mazhar came into the limelight once again when PDM chief Maulana Fazlur Rehman visited the Neelum Valley. During this visit Maulana was hosted by him, and both of them addressed many public gatherings together.

Mazhar Saeed Shah later developed ties with Tehreek-e-Insaaf and got a ticket for the special seat of Ulama and Mashaikh in exchange for PTI's support in the July 25 elections.

References

Living people

Year of birth missing (living people)
Jamia Binoria alumni
University of Karachi alumni